The Rohr Jewish Learning Institute (JLI) is a division of Merkos L'Inyonei Chinuch, the educational arm of the Chabad-Lubavitch Orthodox Jewish Hasidic dynasty. It offers adult Jewish courses on Jewish history, law, ethics, philosophy and rabbinical literature worldwide. It also develops Jewish studies curricula specifically for women, college students, teenagers, and seniors.

In 2014, the organization claimed there were 117,500 people enrolled in JLI, making it the largest Jewish education network in the world. It was created with a mission to make the teachings, values and traditions of the Jewish people accessible and personally meaningful to all Jews, regardless of their background or affiliation. The JLI model combines a research-based approach with instructional design, aiming to present traditional Jewish teachings in a contemporary academic framework. Its headquarters are located in the Crown Heights area at Brooklyn, New York City.

History 
JLI was founded in 1998. The first JLI course, Jewish Mysticism, was piloted at fifteen Chabad centers in 1999. The institute expanded thereafter with controlled growth, introducing the learning program to between fifteen and twenty new cities annually until 2005 when JLI added forty new cities.  Since its inception in 1998, over 500,000 students have completed JLI courses, with enrollment of 12,000 to 16,000 students each semester. By 2010, JLI had developed 37 separate six-week courses, the most popular of which have been on the topics of Jewish thought, law, and mysticism.

In 2005, JLI launched its Torah Studies division, which is currently active in 248 communities around the world, and piloted its first JLI Teens curriculum.
The Sinai Scholars Society was introduced on three college campuses in 2006 and has since expanded to seventy campuses including Ivy League, state and private universities.

In 2005, JLI materials were translated into Spanish to serve the Jewish communities of Central and South America. In 2011, a curriculum in Hebrew was developed and piloted in ten Israeli cities. There are currently thirty JLI locations in Israel as well as classes in Hebrew throughout the world in communities with large concentrations of Israeli ex-pats. The Russian language division was added in 2012 and currently consists of forty chapters throughout the former CIS. JLI course materials were developed in German the same year, and are taught in five cities in Germany.

As of 2013, 382 chapters in twenty-four countries and thirty-one U.S. states offer flagship JLI courses.

As of 2022, over 400 chapters in twenty-eight countries offer flagship JLI courses.

Mission and educational philosophy 
JLI's mission is to make the teachings, values, and traditions of Chabad Judaism accessible to every Jew, regardless of background or affiliation. Courses are designed to be innovative, relevant, and accessible, with the aim of creating "a global network of informed students connected by bonds of shared Jewish experience."

Courses
A network of JLI's affiliated local chapters offers courses to the Jewish communities. JLI's flagship courses consist of six weekly sessions and each class unit is taught concurrently at all of its locations.

Specific JLI courses are accredited to offer Continuing Legal Education credits by the bar associations of 31 U.S. states, in various Canadian provinces, Australia, and the UK, as well as the Order of Flemish Bar Associations, and South Africa's National Board of Licenses.  When appropriate, JLI courses are accredited by the AMA's ACCME Accreditation Council for Continuing Medical Education for Continuing Medical Education credits, as well as by the Washington School of Psychiatry and the American Psychological Association.

JLI was commissioned by the family of former Israeli Prime Minister, Yitzhak Shamir, to develop a series of lunch-hour educational classes to be offered in corporate offices in Israel.

Departments 
In addition to the flagship course offerings, JLI has branched out to offer the following programs geared towards specific segments of the community:

Torah Studies 
The Torah Studies department develops weekly classes taught year-round on Torah portions corresponding to those read in synagogues each Sabbath. Geared towards students seeking on-going Torah study, lessons focus on relevant life issues such as personal growth, business ethics, social responsibilities, personal relationships and the environment.

JLI Teens 
The first teen-focused JLI course was held in 2009. JLI Teens courses aim to make Judaism relevant to teens and to forge a new generation of Jewish leadership. Teens are engaged with a series of comprehensive courses on issues they contemplate and provide a safe place for discussion on topics such as suicide, personal ethics and values, anti-Semitism, purpose in life, relationships, faith and reason, social justice, leadership, and Israel.  

A few select teens in each chapter who demonstrate leadership qualities are invited to join the JLI Teens International Internship Program. The interns' role includes participating in joint conference calls to share ideas, providing early feedback and suggestions to course developers, and partaking in special contests and activities. JLI Teens is offered in seventy cities throughout the United States, Canada, South America, Russia, South Africa, China, Europe and the Middle East.

Sinai Scholars 
The Sinai Scholars Society is an integrated fellowship program for students on college campuses comprising Torah study, social activities, and national networking opportunities. The eight-part curriculum addresses essentials in Judaism, introducing students to the contemporary significance of Jewish life. Students submit an academic paper on Jewish thought, and participate in community and holiday events. Sinai Scholars is offered in partnership with Chabad on Campus at over one hundred universities.

The Sinai Scholars Society sponsors an annual Students and Scholars Academic Symposium. A selected group of university students from across the country present papers on the modern-day relevance of core Jewish ideas and beliefs, the author of the winning paper is awarded a cash prize. At the Symposium students mingle with Jewish scholars in the academic community and connect with peers from other campuses.

Rosh Chodesh Society 
JLI's women's studies division, The Rosh Chodesh Society (RCS), seeks to empower Jewish women to connect with their Jewish heritage, and in turn, inspire their families and greater communities. An international network of female Jewish scholars, leaders, and educators provides members with adult education via monthly cultural and social programs. The program was founded in 2009 in memory of Rivka Holtzberg, the Chabad emissary who, along with her husband, Gavriel Holtzberg, was a victim of a terror attack in Mumbai, India. Its debut course, Rivka's Tent, was a seven-part series of text-based study of the three commandments addressed specifically to Jewish women. RCS has affiliates in over 150 communities around the world.

Torah Café 
In 2009, JLI created Torah Café, a website offering lectures, workshops, and inspiration from its library. The videos cover a broad range of topics available including academic study of Torah, language, Jewish literature, Jewish History, Biographies of Jewish personalities, Jewish music and ethics.

National Jewish Retreat 
JLI sponsors a six-day annual retreat, The National Jewish Retreat, which features live lectures and interactive workshops on Jewish life, law, history, culture and tradition, led by scholars and experts in their various fields of study. The annual retreat is hosted each summer at a hotel and was designed to engage the mind and refresh the spirit, and provides gourmet Kosher cuisine and entertainment.

In 2013, the Retreat launched the annual Jewish Medical Ethics Conference, which features interactive discussions between participating physicians and Jewish medical ethicists on current and emerging quandaries in the field. The conference is accredited by CME.

The Land and The Spirit Israel Experience 
Responding to nationwide demand from students participating in the fall 2007 course on Israel, The Land and the Spirit, JLI launched its first Israel Experience in March 2008. The bi-annual tour presents an insider look at Israel. In addition to visiting historic and religious sites, participants meet with Israeli politicians and decision-makers, Torah scholars and local residents. Participants bring messages of support from their home communities in the diaspora to the IDF and to families of victims of violence. To date, a total of 2,500 Jews from the diaspora have joined JLI's Israel Experience.

Machon Shmuel
Machon Shmuel: The Sami Rohr Research Institute, under the auspices of The Rohr Jewish Learning Institute, has already begun serving dozens of Shluchim worldwide with the experienced Torah scholarship of a dedicated team, providing thorough background research and comprehensive sources covering practically every topic in Torah literature.

Kohelet Foundation Partnership 
Since the fall of 2010, JLI has been a provider of adult Jewish education through the Kohelet Fellowships program, a two-year Jewish learning experience for parents of Jewish day school students.  Fellows study Jewish texts, either in courses or one-on-one, participate in community learning events, and explore the lessons with their families. Fellows receive tuition breaks from their children's schools funded by grants from the Kohelet Foundation and its financial partners. Courses on Judaism and study partners for the participating parents are arranged by JLI and Yeshiva University's Center for a Jewish Future.

Instructor training 
The JLI Academy provides ongoing training to its affiliated instructors in pedagogy and in-depth study of subjects relating to curriculum content. The Academy organizes an annual conference, intermittent webinars, podcasts, interactive instruction and one-to-one training opportunities. The JLI Academy also serves as a forum of discussion between the curriculum development team and affiliates. The Academy acts as a sounding board for instructors, and provides guidance.

The JLI Conference is dedicated to sharing tips and ideas for adult education, and learning new ways of expanding and improving the more than 350 JLI chapters around the world.  The conference includes renowned experts including Rabbi Issamar Ginzberg, Yeshiva University's Dr. David Pelcovitz, direct marketing pioneer Alan Rosenspan, communication educator Michael Brandwein, Professor Jonathan Sarna, Rabbi Berel Bell, and Rabbi Yosef Yitzchak Jacobson.

References

External links 
 
National Jewish Retreat
The Wellness Institute
JLI Teens

Organizations based in New York City
Chabad outreach
Jewish education
Crown Heights, Brooklyn